The Marquardt MA-74 was a ramjet engine built by the Marquardt Corporation for use in supersonic target drones in the 1960s.

History
The MA-74 was developed by Marquardt for use as a powerplant for high-speed target drones; its primary use was in the North American Redhead and Roadrunner. A nacelle-type ramjet, it used a normal shock inlet, and was designed to be mounted on top of the aircraft; fuel was ordinary JP-4.

Variants and applications
MA-74-ZAB
North American MQM-42

Specifications (XPJ40-MD-2)

References

Citations

Bibliography

Pulsejet engines